Jagora asperata is a species of freshwater snail with an operculum, an aquatic gastropod mollusk in the family Pachychilidae. Jagora asperata is the type species of the genus Jagora.

Description

This shell is solid, dark brown to yellowish brown, highly tower–shaped, comprising up to twelve whorls. The apical whorl is truncated. The sculpture of the shell shows closely spaced axial ribs and spiral elements with tiny nodules.

The body of these snails is gray to black with filiform antennae. They are characterized by a unique reproductive system, including a long sperm gutter, a very short a spermatophore bursa and a prominent lateral ridge working as a seminal receptacle. Females carry eggs and juvenile stages within their mantle cavity. These snails feed on detritus and algae.

Distribution and habitat
This species occurs in the northern part of the Philippines, on Luzon, Leyte Island, Samar Island and several other small islands. They live in small mountain rivers with stony or sandy bottoms.

References

External links 

Pachychilidae Jagora aperata at heimbiotop.de
Asean Biodiversity
Worldwide Mollusc Species Data Base

Pachychilidae
Gastropods described in 1822